Za Kabuki, founded in 1976 at the Australian National University, is the longest running Kabuki troupe outside Japan. Directed by Shun Ikeda of the ANU Japan Centre, with a cast and crew consisting mainly of ANU Japanese students, the troupe performs traditional Kabuki plays almost entirely in classical Japanese, with some English translation and ad-libs inserted to assist the mainly English-speaking audiences.

History
The tradition of annual Japanese performances at the ANU began in 1976, with the first shows taking place in the walkway between the Sports & Recreation building and the Union building. During the 1980s and 1990s, productions became increasingly elaborate, with authentic makeup and costumes, original sets and musical accompaniment, hosted at a number of the theatre facilities around the ANU campus.

In 1999, Producer Suzy Styles led the Za Kabuki troupe on their first tour of Japan, with performances in Nara and Kobe. On 11 September 2001, a troupe from Kobe's Konan University returned the favour by performing at the ANU's Llewellyn Hall.

The 2006 production of Yukio Mishima's Iwashiuri Koi no Hikiami, for the first time in Za Kabuki history, featured a 7-piece orchestra, also made up predominantly of ANU Japan Centre students. The orchestra played an original score, composed specifically for the play by Thomas Spencer Hartley.

2013 marked Za Kabuki's first performance in the absence of long-time director, Shun Ikeda. Instead the role of director was taken on by third-year ANU student and former kuroko, Noriyuki Yabe. Despite the timing of the performance coinciding with exam period, the 2013 performance of Kagotsurube managed to sell over four hundred tickets in a twenty-four-hour period and was greatly praised by critics.

In 2016, the crew once again travelled to Japan, performing three shows in the Tohoku region, particularly in areas affected by the 2011 Earthquake and Tsunami.  The tour was highly successful and deepened ties between the club and communities in Akita, Kesennuma and Ishinomaki.

In 2017, the group conducted a performance tour in Melbourne, performing 'Topknot Bunshichi' at two venues.  The shows were received well and preceded two sell-out nights in Canberra in early October.

In 2019, the group visited Cowra and performed at the Festival of International Understanding where Japan was the guest nation. The show was very well received by a large audience of school children and locals. 

In 2020, the group decided to go online with their performance due to COVID-19.

Past performances

See also
 Kabuki
 Rakugo

References

Australian National University
Kabuki
Amateur theatre companies in Australia